Oluola Slawn is a British-Nigerian designer and artist. Most of his works include spray paint, large-scale pop art canvases, graffiti, caricatures and murals. In 2023, he became the youngest person to design the Britannia statuette for the annual BRIT awards.

Career
He had his debut exhibition in September 2021 at Truman Brewery on Brick Lane. In an interview with The Face, he is quoted as saying, "I don’t even know why people want this shit ... I wouldn’t buy this shit. I just have no interest in my art. I make it so I can fuck about.”

After working as a shop assistant in a skate shop, he and fellow skaters Leo and Onyedi started a streetwear brand called Motherlan.

In 2022, Skepta debuted his first painting on a collection for Sotheby's auction organized by Slawn for charity.

He was the statuette and set designer for the 2023 Brit Awards.

References

External links
Official

2000 births
Living people
British contemporary artists
Nigerian contemporary artists
Graffiti artists
BRIT Award trophy designers